Herbertsdale is a settlement in Garden Route District Municipality in the Western Cape province of South Africa.

Village east of the Gourits River, in the Langtou Valley, 56 km north-west of Mossel Bay. It was established in 1865 on the farm Hemelrood and named after James Benton Herbert, who owned part of this farm.

References

Populated places in the Mossel Bay Local Municipality